Mirani may refer to:

Places

Australia
 Mirani, Queensland
 Electoral district of Mirani
 Shire of Mirani

Oman
 Fort Al-Mirani, a fort in the harbour of the city of Old Muscat

Pakistan
 Mirani, Balochistan
 Mirani, Sindh
 Mirani Dam, a dam on the Kech River, Balochistan province

Iran
 Marani, Iran
 Mirani, Iran

Other uses
 Mirani dynasty, a tribe of Baloch who were influential in India between the 15th and 18th centuries
 Mirani (tribe), living in Sindh province of Pakistan
Mirani (rapper), South Korean rapper